Roger D. Solum (born July 1, 1953) is an American politician and a former Republican member of the South Dakota House of Representatives representing District 5 since January 2009.

Elections
2012 Solum and incumbent Representative Melissa Magstadt were unopposed for the June 5, 2012 Republican Primary and won the three-way November 6, 2012 General election where Representative Madstadt took the first seat and Solum took the second seat with 5,844 votes (39.4%) ahead of Democratic nominee Dorothy Kellogg.
2008 When District 5 incumbent Republican Representatives Al Koistinen ran for South Dakota Senate and left a District 5 seat open, Solum  and incumbent Representative Bob Faehn were unopposed for the June 3, 2008 Republican Primary and won the four-way November 4, 2008 General election where Representative Faehn took the first seat and Solum took the second seat with 5,617 votes (31.2%) ahead of Democratic nominees Curt Johnson and Juanita Lentz.
2010 When incumbent Representative Faehn left the Legislature and left a District 5 seat open, Solum ran in the three-way June 8, 2010 Republican Primary and placed second with 1,062 votes (34.8%); in the three-way November 2, 2010 General election fellow Republican nominee Melissa Madstadt took the first seat and Solum took the second seat with 4,514 votes (34.23%) ahead of Democratic nominee Jeff Dunn.

References

External links
Official page at the South Dakota Legislature
 

Place of birth missing (living people)
Living people
Republican Party members of the South Dakota House of Representatives
People from Watertown, South Dakota
1953 births
21st-century American politicians